Coast to Coast Fever is the third solo album by Canadian singer-songwriter David Wiffen.  He is assisted on the album by fellow Canadian folkie Bruce Cockburn, who plays guitar, bass and celeste, and also produced the album. The best-known tracks are "Skybound Station", "Coast to Coast Fever", "Smoke Rings", "We Have Had Some Good Times" and "Lucifer's Blues".  Seven of the ten songs were written by Wiffen.

History
The album was released in 1973, and was heavily promoted by United Artists, and received positive reviews and substantial radio play. It was nominated for a 1974 Juno Award in the "Best Folk Album" category, but lost to Gordon Lightfoot's Old Dan's Records.

Track listing
All tracks composed by David Wiffen; except where indicated
"Skybound Station" – 3:50
"Coast to Coast Fever" – 4:01
"White Lines"  (Willie P. Bennett) – 4:00
"Smoke Rings" – 3:57
"Climb the Stairs" – 4:07
"You Need a New Lover Now"  (Murray McLauchlan) – 4:06
"We Have Had Some Good Times" – 3:20
"Lucifer's Blues" – 5:45
"Up on the Hillside"  (Bruce Cockburn) – 2:51
"Full Circle" – 3:18

Personnel
David Wiffen - guitar, vocals
Bruce Cockburn - guitar, bass, celeste, vocals 
Dennis Pendrith - bass
Skip Beckwith - bass
Pat Godfrey - piano
Pat Ricio - piano
John Savage – drums
Bill Usher – congas
Andy Cree – drums
Bruce Pennycock – tenor and soprano saxophone
Brian Ahern – string arrangement

Production
Producer: Bruce Cockburn, Brian Ahern
Recording Engineer: Bill Seddon, Bruce Cockburn, Chris Skene
Album Design: Lloyd Ziff
Art Direction: Mike Salisbury
Photography: Mike Salisbury
Liner Notes: Richard Flohill

References 

David Wiffen albums
1973 albums
Albums produced by Brian Ahern (producer)
United Artists Records albums